
Laguna Chilata is a lake in the Larecaja Province, La Paz Department, Bolivia. At an elevation of 5030 m, its surface area is 0.05 km².

References 

Lakes of La Paz Department (Bolivia)